Frederick Selwyn Copleston (1850–1935) was a member of the Indian Civil Service. He was the Chief Judge of the Chief Court of Lower Burma from 1900 to 1902.

Biography 
Copleston was the son of Rev. R. E. Copleston, Fellow of Exeter College, Oxford and Vicar of Edmonton. He was a member of the Copleston family, lords of the manor of Copleston in Devon until 1659. Reginald Stephen Copleston, Bishop of Calcutta and Ernest Arthur Copleston, Bishop of Colombo were his brothers. 

After education at Marlborough College, Copleston joined the ICS in July 1873 and arrived in India in October 1873, when he was appointed Assistant Magistrate and Collector in Allahabad. He volunteer for service in Burma the following year and was posted there an Assistant Commissioner, and held various offices before being appointed Judicial Commissioner of Lower Burma in 1898. When the Court of the Judicial Commissioner was replaced in 1900, Copleston was appointed the first Chief Judge of the Chief Court of Lower Burma.  

He retired in April 1902 and returned to England. According to his family, he had been asked by Lord Curzon to serve as Lieutenant-Governor of Burma, but refused, whereupon Curzon struck off his name from the honours list. In retirement he was a Justice of the Peace for Somerset.

Family 
Copleston married Elizabeth Colley of Clontarf, of Dublin in 1883; she died in 1895. He married secondly Norah Margaret Little, daughter of Colonel Colhoun-Little, MD, IMS, in 1902; they had two sons, one of whom was the Jesuit philosopher and theologian Frederick Charles Copleston.

References 

Sources
 Frederick C. Copleston, S.J. Memoirs of a Philosopher. Kansas City, MO: Sheed & Ward, 1993.
 The India List and India Office List for 1905. London: Harrison and Sons, 1905.

British Burma judges
1935 deaths
Indian Civil Service (British India) officers
People educated at Marlborough College
1850 births
Administrators in British Burma
English justices of the peace